Coleophora centrota is a moth of the family Coleophoridae. It is found in Kodagu district of Karnataka, south-western India.

The wingspan is about 9 mm. The head, palpi, antennae and thorax are whitish-ochreous. The antennae are simple. The forewings are lanceolate and pale ochreous, slightly tinged with grey posteriorly. The second discal stigma is rather large and blackish. The hindwings and cilia are whitish-grey-ochreous.

References

centrota
Moths described in 1917
Moths of Asia